The 1994 National Camogie League is a competition in the women's team field sport of camogie was won by Galway for the first time, defeating Tipperary in the final, played at Ballinasloe.

Arrangements
For the second season the National League was played on an experimental basis with 15-a-side in advance of camogie moving to the 15-a-side game in 1999. Tipperary, who had won the Intermediate Championship in 1996, entered the senior league to gain some experience of playing at this level and defeated Wexford, Kildare, Clare and surprised Kilkenny 4-8 to 2-7 in the semi-final to reach their first final since the 1976-77 season. Deirdre Hughes scored 3-3 and Noelle Kennedy 1-8 in the semi-final. Galway pulled off a surprise in the other semi-final as two first half goals by Olivia Broderick gave them the platform to defeat Cork by 5-10 to 2-6.

The Final
Galway opened up an early 0-4 to 0-1 lead in the sunshine in the final before Noelle Kennedy put the sides level with a well taken goal for Tipeperary. The sides were level four times between then and half time when the score was Galway -0-7 Tipperary 1-4. Galway broke clear at the beginning of the second half and opened up a five-point lead through two points by Sharon Glynn and a goal by Imelda Hobbins.

Division 2
The Junior National League, known since 2006 as Division Two, was won by Armagh who defeated Cork intermediates in the final.

Final stages

References

External links
 Camogie Association

National Camogie League
1994